The athletics competition at the 1991 European Youth Olympic Days was held from 18 to 20 July. The events took place in Brussels, Belgium. Boys and girls born 1976 or 1977 or later participated 24 track and field events, divided equally between the sexes with the exception of 2000 metres steeplechase and pole vault for boys but not girls.

Medal summary

Men

 The boys hurdles were contested over hurdles at the junior height of three feet and three inches (99 cm), as opposed to the standard three feet (91.4 cm) for youth competitions.

Women

References

Results
1991 European Youth Olympics. World Junior Athletics History. Retrieved on 2014-11-25.
European Youth Olympics. GBR Athletics. Retrieved on 2014-11-25.

1991 European Youth Olympic Days
European Youth Olympic Days
1991
1991 in Belgian sport
International athletics competitions hosted by Belgium